Carlos Alexi Arboleda Ruíz (born January 24, 1991) is an Ecuadorian footballer who plays for C.D. Técnico Universitario as a defender.

References

External links
FEF card 

1991 births
Living people
Ecuadorian footballers
Ecuadorian Serie A players
C.D. Quevedo footballers
L.D.U. Quito footballers
L.D.U. Portoviejo footballers
L.D.U. Loja footballers
C.S.D. Macará footballers
People from Guayaquil
Association football fullbacks